Kachnal Gosain is a census town in Udham Singh Nagar district in the Indian state of Uttarakhand.

Geography

Demographics
 India census, Kachnal Gosain had a population of 4199. Males constitute 57% of the population and females 43%. Kachnal Gosain has an average literacy rate of 72%, higher than the national average of 59.5%: male literacy is 79%, and female literacy is 63%. In Kachnal Gosain, 14% of the population is under 6 years of age.

References

Cities and towns in Udham Singh Nagar district